The Detroit Experiment is a 2003 studio album by The Detroit Experiment, a collaborative project including DJ/producer Carl Craig, saxophonist Bennie Maupin, trumpeter Marcus Belgrave, pianist Geri Allen, and violinist Regina Carter. It peaked at number 17 on the Billboard Jazz Albums chart, as well as number 24 on the Top Dance/Electronic Albums chart.

It is the second entry in a series of albums, the first being The Philadelphia Experiment (2001) and the third being The Harlem Experiment (2007).

Track listing

Charts

References

External links
 

2003 albums
Ropeadope Records albums